Kauno Baltų Ainiai is an ice hockey team located in Kaunas, Lithuania, which plays in the Lithuania Hockey League, the top tier of ice hockey in Lithuania. They play home games at the Kaunas Ice Arena.

History
Kauno Baltų Ainiai was founded in 2019 and immediately joined the Lithuania Hockey League. The team was initially known as Baltų Ainiai/HC Klaipėda, following the merger to two separate hockey schools. Their debut season was a torrid one, losing 17 of their 18 games, finishing last in the league. In the following offseason, the team changed its name to Kauno Baltų Ainiai, with the HC Klaipėda school instead teaming up with new comers Energija Hockey in order to create Energija Hockey/HC Klaipėda.

Roster 
Updated January 26, 2021.

Season-by-season record
Note: GP = Games played, W = Wins, L = Losses, T = Ties, OTL = Overtime losses, Pts = Points, GF = Goals for, GA = Goals against, PIM = Penalties in minutes

References

External links
 

Sport in Kaunas
Ice hockey teams in Lithuania
Lithuanian Hockey League teams
Ice hockey clubs established in 2019
2019 establishments in Lithuania